Marcin Krukowski (born 14 June 1992) is a Polish track and field athlete who competes in the javelin throw. His personal best throw of 89.55 m, set in 2021, is the Polish record. He has represented his nation at three World Championships (2013, 2015 and 2017). His best performance is ninth place (2017). He also represented Poland at the 2016 Summer Olympics and the 2020 Summer Olympics.

Personal life
He is the son of Agnieszka and Michał Krukowski, both of whom are former javelin throwers.

Competition record

Seasonal bests by year
2009 – 65.95
2010 – 72.10
2011 – 79.19
2012 – 82.58
2013 – 83.04
2014 – 80.66
2015 – 85.20
2016 – 84.74
2017 – 88.09 
2018 – 84.55
2021 – 89.55 NR

References

Polish male javelin throwers
Living people
Athletes from Warsaw
1992 births
World Athletics Championships athletes for Poland
Athletes (track and field) at the 2016 Summer Olympics
Olympic athletes of Poland
Polish Athletics Championships winners
Competitors at the 2017 Summer Universiade
Athletes (track and field) at the 2020 Summer Olympics
21st-century Polish people